The 1971 Arkansas Razorbacks football team represented the University of Arkansas in the Southwest Conference (SWC) during the 1971 NCAA University Division football season. In their 14th year under head coach Frank Broyles, the Razorbacks compiled an 8–3–1 record (5–1–1 against SWC opponents), finished in second place behind Texas in the SWC, and outscored all opponents by a combined total of 356 to 169.  The team finished the season ranked #16 in the final AP Poll and #20 in the final UPI Coaches Poll and went on to lose the 1971 Liberty Bowl to Tennessee by a 14–13 score.

The Razorbacks assumed the driver's seat for their first trip to the Cotton Bowl Classic since 1965 following a 31-7 rout of archrival Texas in Little Rock, but followed that by losing at home to Texas A&M and tying lowly Rice on the road, allowing the Longhorns to regain the Southwest Conference lead and go on to their fourth consecutive conference championship. 

Kicker Bill McClard was an All American. McClard also averaged 6.5 points per game, the seventh best average nationally. Razorback quarterback Joe Ferguson was eighth in the nation in completions per game, with 14.5. Mike Reppond averaged 5.6 receptions per game, the fourth highest average during 1971. As an offense, Arkansas averaged 211.5 yards per game, the highest in the SWC, and eighth-highest in college football. Arkansas was seventh in total offense, with a total of 4898 yards over 11 games.

Schedule

Roster

Liberty Bowl

The 1971 Liberty Bowl matched up Arkansas with Tennessee. The Volunteers took the lead first, with a two-yard run by Bill Rudder. The Hogs responded with a 36-yard TD strike from Joe Ferguson to Jim Hodge. Scoring wouldn't resume until the fourth quarter, when Razorback Bill McClard kicked 19- and 30-yard field goals. A third McClard kick was good, set up by Louis Campbell's third interception, but a penalty kept the Hogs off the board a fourth time. Arkansas fumbled at their own 36-yard line, and Tennessee's Curt Watson scored three plays later.

''Source: Razorback Bowl History – 1971 Liberty Bowl

References

Arkansas
Arkansas Razorbacks football seasons
Arkansas Razorbacks football